Bullock is an unincorporated community that straddles Woodland Township, Burlington County and Manchester Township, Ocean County in the middle of the New Jersey Pine Barrens. Much of the area surrounding Bullock is a part of the Brendan T. Byrne State Forest though there are some clearings for small houses along Savoy Boulevard in Woodland Township and Pasadena Road in Manchester Township. The settlement is located where these two roads, the New Jersey Southern Railroad, and the Keith line (separating the two counties) converge.

References

Manchester Township, New Jersey
Woodland Township, New Jersey
Populated places in the Pine Barrens (New Jersey)
Unincorporated communities in Burlington County, New Jersey
Unincorporated communities in Ocean County, New Jersey
Unincorporated communities in New Jersey